Eleven80 is a  tall residential skyscraper in Newark, New Jersey. Named for its address at 1180 Raymond Boulevard, Eleven 80 is located in Downtown Newark, just north of Four Corners across from Military Park. A hallmark of the Newark skyline since its construction as a 36-story office building in 1930, it is noted for its Art Deco detail and ornamentation.
  

Designed by prominent Newark architect Frank Grad, it was the tallest building in the city until the National Newark Building opened the following year. Vacant since 1986, it was converted into residential use after a $120 million renovation by the Cogswell Group, and re-opened in 2006. The new apartments were the first unsubsidized rental units in downtown Newark since completion of the Pavilion and Colonnade Apartments in 1960.

The five-story base features terra cotta panels and metal spandrels decorated with geometric floral motifs. The letters "LN" can be seen above the third floor, for Lefcourt Newark, the original name of the building. Today it consists of 317 luxury one- and two-bedroom rental residences, renting at prices below the New York City, Jersey City and Hoboken markets. The building features amenities including a health club, bowling alley, basketball court and media room and offers a free van service to the grocery store, train and airport.

See also
American Insurance Company Building
 List of tallest buildings in Newark

References

External links
Graph of New Jersey's ten tallest buildings
Old Newark.com office building images
Newark skycraper photos
BCDC Newark buildings and sites

Residential skyscrapers in Newark, New Jersey
Art Deco architecture in New Jersey
Art Deco skyscrapers
Apartment buildings in Newark, New Jersey
Historic district contributing properties in Newark, New Jersey
National Register of Historic Places in Newark, New Jersey